List of Canadian ambassadors to Japan. Canada's third legation abroad was established in Japan in May 1929 in Tokyo with Herbert Marler as the first minister plenipotentiary to the country. Diplomatic relations had been established in December 1928. The mission was downgraded in 1938 due to the worsening international situation with the Chargé d'affaires becoming the lead official. Diplomatic relations were severed after the Japanese attack on World War II. Following the war, Canada's mission in Tokyo was accredited to the Supreme Commander Allied Powers. Formal diplomatic relations were re-established in 1952..

References

Sources
Department of Foreign Affairs and International Trade

Japan
 
Canada